Graham de Conde Gund (born 1940) is an American architect and the president of the Gund Partnership, an American architecture firm based in Cambridge, Massachusetts, and founded by Gund in 1971. An heir to George Gund II, he is also a collector of contemporary art, whose collection has been widely exhibited and published.

A native of Cleveland, Ohio where he was born in 1940, Gund was educated at Westminster School (Connecticut), Kenyon College, and the Rhode Island School of Design. Gund graduated from the  Harvard University Graduate School of Design, with a Master of Architecture degree in 1968 and a Master of Urban Design degree in 1969. Graham Gund is one of six children of George Gund II, former chairman of the Cleveland Trust Company, philanthropist and namesake for the Graduate School of Design's George Gund Hall, completed in 1971. His siblings are George III b. 1937; Agnes b. 1938; Gordon b. 1939; Geoffrey b.1942; Louise b. 1944.

After graduation, Gund worked at The Architects' Collaborative in Cambridge, Massachusetts. Gund himself undertook property development for a number of his firm's projects.  He is also a noted collector of art. Gund funded the Gund Gallery at the Museum of Fine Arts in Boston. Gund was also the driving force behind the founding of the Gund Gallery at Kenyon College. He designed the museum's building, a LEED Silver-certified project that garnered multiple architectural awards. With his wife Ann, he gave a substantial gift of over 80 modern and contemporary artworks to start the museum's permanent collection.

Architecture
After working with modern architect Walter Gropius at the Architects' Collaborative, Gund began his career with significant projects that drew from a modernist vocabulary. The Hyatt Regency Cambridge, with its stepped massing, recalled legendary projects by architects Adolf Loos and Henri Sauvage, while utilizing red brick characteristic of Cambridge's collegiate river-side architecture. For Boston's Institute for Contemporary Art, Gund created an unexpected, open, angular interior that played against the rigid geometry of a historic Richardsonian Romanesque building.

The firm became well known during the 1980s for extending this creative take on architecture through significant national projects, some of which were prominent adaptive uses while others were new buildings. Additional museums and education buildings represented the continued expansion of Gund's practice in these years. Among the adaptive uses was the Norwalk Maritime Center in Connecticut, a museum and aquarium project housed in a salvaged iron works complex, with a new IMAX theater. New institutional buildings included major structures for Plimoth Plantation in Plymouth, MA, and for the Fernbank Museum of Natural History in Atlanta.

At this time, Gund played a role as both architect and developer to reclaim threatened or damaged historic buildings, as in the Church Court Condominiums in Boston and Bulfinch Square in Cambridge. Such activity even led to his being described by Vincent Scully as a "convinced preservationist," comparing Gund to Charles Bulfinch.

Among Gund's early work was the Rockefeller residence in Cambridge (1973), the Hyatt Regency Cambridge (1976) and the former Institute for Contemporary Art, now the Boston Architectural College (1976). Much of Gund's work in this period involved renovations or residential adaptive reuse projects in the Boston area. Other projects included the Johnston Guardhouse at Harvard Yard (1983), adaptive reuse of an ironworks building for the Maritime Aquarium at Norwalk (1988), and the Art Deco Revival 31-story 75 State Street (also known as the Fleet Bank Center), Boston (1989), in association with Skidmore, Owings and Merrill. In the 1990s Gund's work expanded to include considerable work with Disney Company in Florida and Paris. Gund was featured on This Old House in 1992 as the architect for the television show's Igoe Residence project. By the 2000s Gund's work was primarily focused on school and university projects.

Recent work

Recent notable buildings designed by the firm include the headquarters for the National Association of Realtors in Washington, D.C., occupying a prominent location on New Jersey Avenue, the conservatory for the Cleveland Botanical Garden, the Lansburgh Theater for the Folger Shakespeare Library in Washington, DC, The Fannie Cox Math and Science Center for Friends' Central School in Wynnewood, PA, the synagogue building for Young Israel of Brookline, Massachusetts, the Kenyon Athletic Center, and buildings on many American college campuses, including those of Harvard University, Denison University, and Kenyon College. Gund also designed the Boston Ballet Headquarters on Clarendon Street in Boston, Massachusetts.

Work for Disney
Gund has designed a number of projects in the Disney Company's planned community of Celebration, Florida, noted for a high concentration of work by major architectural firms invited by Disney.
 Coronado Springs Resort, Walt Disney World, Florida (design architect)
 Celebration Hotel and Celebration High School

Other work by Gund for Disney includes the International Retail and Manufacturers' Showcase at Euro Disney.

Publications
Gund's work has been widely published throughout his career, with articles by major critics in national publications.  The firm's architecture has been the subject of two books: Gund Partnership 1994-2007, with an extensive foreword by New York Times architecture critic Paul Goldberger, and Graham Gund Architects, published in 1993, with an introduction by Vincent Scully.

He is married to Ann Gund née Landreth, with whom he has one son, Graydon. He is a Fellow of the American Institute of Architects.

Additional Gund projects
 Church Court Condominiums, Boston (1983) - re-modelled Mt. Vernon Church, corner Beacon St. + Massachusetts Ave., developed by Gund

 Bostix Kiosk, Copley Square, Boston (1992)
 Kenyon Athletic Center, Ohio (built 2006)
 Newton North High School, Massachusetts (built 2010)
Armour Academic Center, Westminster School
Armstrong Dining Hall, Westminster School

The firm is also known for historic redevelopment projects including Bulfinch Square in Cambridge, Massachusetts. Major museum projects include the Plimoth Plantation Visitor Center in Plymouth, Massachusetts, and the Fernbank Museum of Natural History in Atlanta, Georgia.

References

Bibliography
 Gund Partnership 1994-2007, Mahar, Christa, ed., Mulgrave, Australia.: Images Publishing Group, 2008. , introduction by Paul Goldberger
 Rapaport, Richard. Graham Gund Architects: American Institute of Architects Press, 1993. , introduction by Vincent Scully

External links

 Gund Partnership

Rhode Island School of Design alumni
Kenyon College alumni
Living people
Architects from Cambridge, Massachusetts
Westminster School (Connecticut) alumni
Harvard Graduate School of Design alumni
1940 births
20th-century American architects
21st-century American architects
Architects from Cleveland